Adolph I of Cleves (2 August 1373 – 23 September 1448) was the second Count of Cleves and the fourth Count of Mark.

Life 
He was the son of Adolph III, Count of Mark, and Margaret of Jülich (and thus the brother of Margaret of Cleves).

After his father's death in 1394, he became Count of Cleves. In 1397 he defeated his uncle William VII of Jülich, 1st Duke of Berg in the battle of Kleverhamm and became Lord of Ravenstein.

When his brother Dietrich IX, Count of Mark died in battle in 1398, he also became Count of Mark. Adolph further expanded his influence by marrying a daughter of the Duke of Burgundy. As a result, Cleves was raised to a Duchy by the Holy Roman Emperor, Sigismund, in 1417.

From 1409 onwards he faced opposition from his younger brother Gerhard, who claimed the County of Mark.  By 1423, their dispute resulted in an armed conflict, with Gerhard allying himself with the Archbishop of Cologne.

A peace was signed between the two brothers in 1430 and confirmed in 1437. As a result, Gerhard ruled the largest part of Mark, but was to be succeeded by his nephew John. He was not allowed to call himself Count of Mark, but has to use the title Count zur Mark. After Gerhard's death in 1461, the County of Mark and the Duchy of Cleves were reunited again.

Marriage and children 

Shortly before the year 1400 he married Agnes, daughter of Rupert of Germany and Elisabeth of Nuremberg. Agnes died a year later with no issue. 
In 1406 Adolf married Marie of Burgundy, daughter of John the Fearless and Margaret of Bavaria. They had the following issue:

 Margarethe (23 February 1416 – 20 May 1444) married as her first husband William III, Duke of Bavaria on 11 May 1433; and as her second husband Ulrich V, Count of Württemberg on 29 January 1441
 Catherine (25 May 1417 – 10 February 1479) married Arnold, Duke of Guelders, on 23 July 1423
 John (1419–1481), succeeded as Duke of Cleves
 Elisabeth (1420–1488) married on 15 July 1434 Henry XXVI, of Schwarzburg-Blankenburg (1418–1488)
 Agnes (1422–1446) married Charles IV, King of Navarre, on 30 September 1439 in Olite
 Helen (1423–1471) married on 12 February 1436 Henry "the Peaceful", Duke of Brunswick-Lüneburg (c. 1411–1473)
 Adolph (1425–1492) married on 13 May 1453, to Beatrice of Portugal (1435–1462), daughter of Peter, Duke of Coimbra
 Mary (1426–1487) married Charles, Duke of Orléans; became parents of Louis XII, King of France

Ancestry

References 
 stirnet.com Accessed September 9, 2007

Sources

|-

Counts of the Mark
Dukes of Cleves
1373 births
1448 deaths
Lords of Ravenstein
14th-century German nobility
15th-century German nobility